Szárföld is a village in Győr-Moson-Sopron county, Hungary.

In the 19th century, a small Jewish community lived in the village, many of whose members were murdered in the Holocaust

External links 
 Street map (Hungarian)

References

Populated places in Győr-Moson-Sopron County
Jewish communities destroyed in the Holocaust